Winter Swimming World Championships (WSWC)  is masters championships in the men's and women's age categories (A to J2)  organized by International Winter Swimming Association (IWSA) which was founded in 2006 after great success and huge international attendance at the 2006 Finnish Winter Swimming Championships in Oulu. They have been held at biennial intervals in various locations since the year 2000 and follow the IWSA winter swimming rules.

Overview 

The planned venue for the WSWC 2022 Championship is Lake Onega near the town of Petrozavodsk in the Republic of Karelia in Russia, on 21 to 27 March 2022. And in following references are additional facts concerning WSWC 2020 in Bled.

References

External links 

 video  IWSA - 10 years
 WSWC 2022

Winter swimming